unu (Romanian for "one"; lower case used on purpose) was the name of an avant-garde art and literary magazine, published in Romania from April 1928 to December 1932. Edited by writers Sașa Pană and Moldov, it was dedicated to Dada and Surrealism. 

The first ten numbers were printed in Dorohoi, and the rest in Bucharest. The first issues were printed in 100 copies and the last in 500 copies. Issue 18 was never published and Issue 51 was never sold (published hors-commerce in 1935, it was distributed in 50 copies to guests at Moldov's wedding).

In addition to contributions Pană and Moldov, the magazine published samples from the works of Romanian and foreign avant-garde authors alike. These include Geo Bogza, Urmuz, Stephan Roll, Ilarie Voronca, Tristan Tzara, Benjamin Fondane, André Breton, Robert Desnos and Paul Éluard. unu also published graphics from Surrealist artists such as Victor Brauner.

External links
unu archive at BCU Cluj digital library (some issues missing)

Dada
Defunct magazines published in Romania
Defunct literary magazines published in Europe
Magazines established in 1928
Magazines disestablished in 1935
Magazines published in Bucharest
Mass media in Dorohoi
Romanian avant-garde
Visual arts magazines published in Romania
Romanian-language magazines
Literary magazines published in Romania
Surrealist magazines
Avant-garde magazines